Andrea Faccini (born 23 August 1966) is an Italian former cyclist. He competed in the sprint event at the 1988 Summer Olympics.

References

External links
 

1966 births
Living people
Italian male cyclists
Olympic cyclists of Italy
Cyclists at the 1988 Summer Olympics
Sportspeople from the Province of Piacenza
Cyclists from Emilia-Romagna